Tufanganj railway station serves the city of Tufanganj lying in Cooch Behar district in the Indian state of West Bengal. The station lies in New Cooch Behar-Golokganj branch line under Alipurduar railway division of Northeast Frontier Railway zone. Important trains like Alipurduar–Silghat Town Rajya Rani Express, Siliguri–Dhubri Intercity Express are available from Tufanganj.

References

Alipurduar railway division
Railway stations in West Bengal